Thomas Wiliam Chester-Master (15 May 1841 – 14 November 1914)  was an English Conservative politician who sat in the House of Commons from 1878 to 1885.

Chester-Master was born in London, the eldest son of Thomas William Chester Master and his wife Catherine Elizabeth Cornewall daughter of Sir George Cornewall, 4th Baronet. He was educated at Harrow School and Christ Church, Oxford.  He was a Major in the Royal North Gloucestershire Militia and a J.P. for Gloucestershire and Monmouthshire.

In March 1878 Chester-Master was elected at a by-election as the Member of Parliament (MP) for the borough of Cirencester. He held the seat until the parliamentary borough was abolished at the 1885 general election.  Chester-Master did not stand for Parliament again until the 1892 general election, when he contested the new Cirencester division of Gloucestershire. He tied in votes with Harry Lawson Webster Lawson but lost in the run-off by-election in 1893.

Chester-Master died at the age of 73.

Family

Chester-Master married in 1866, Georgina Emily Rolls, fifth daughter of John Etherington Welch Rolls of The Hendre, Monmouthshire.

References

External links

1841 births
1914 deaths
UK MPs 1874–1880
UK MPs 1880–1885
UK MPs 1892–1895
People educated at Harrow School
Alumni of Christ Church, Oxford
Conservative Party (UK) MPs for English constituencies
Members of the Parliament of the United Kingdom for Cirencester
19th-century British military personnel